A ballroom or ballhall is a large room inside a building, the primary purpose of which is holding large formal parties called balls. Traditionally, most balls were held in private residences; many mansions and palaces, especially historic mansions and palaces, contain one or more ballrooms. In other large houses, a large room such as the main drawing room, long gallery, or hall may double as a ballroom, but a good ballroom should have the right type of flooring, such as hardwood flooring or stone flooring (usually marble or stone).. For most styles of modern dance, a wooden sprung floor offers the best surface.

In later times the term ballroom has been used to describe nightclubs where customers dance, the Top Rank Suites in the United Kingdom for example were also often referred to as ballrooms. The phrase "having a ball" has grown to encompass many events where person(s) are having fun, not just dancing.

Ballrooms are generally quite large, and may have ceilings higher than other rooms in the same building. The large amount of space for dancing, as well as the highly formal tone of events have given rise to ballroom dancing. The largest balls are now nearly always held in public buildings, and many hotels have a ballroom. They are also designed large to help the sound of orchestras carry well throughout the whole room.

A special case is the annual Vienna Opera Ball, where, just for one night, the auditorium of the Vienna State Opera is turned into a large ballroom. On the eve of the event, the rows of seats are removed from the stalls, and a new floor, level with the stage, is built.

Sometimes ballrooms have stages in the front of the room where the host or a special guest can speak. That stage can also be used for instrumentalists and musical performers.

List of hardwood US floor ballrooms

These lists should only include ballrooms with permanent wood floors. The size of the floor should only include the largest contiguous area without obstructions. The web sites and materials about some places add up multiple spaces, rooms, and balconies, and floors. However, this list ranks ballrooms based on the size of one single open space with a hardwood floor.

See also
 Aragon Ballroom (Ocean Park, Santa Monica, California)
 Ballroom an album of Irish music by De Dannan
 Nightclub

References

Further reading
Robert Meyer,"Millennium Maple – Glorious, Historic, Legendary, Treasured Ballroom Dance Floors", Amateur Dancers, Jan/Feb 2000, Issue#123.
Geronimo Trevino. Dance Halls and Last Calls: A History of Texas Country Music. Lanham, MD: Republic of Texas Press 2002. . Copyright

External links
Texas Dance Hall Preservation Inc.
List of ballrooms at the National Ballroom & Entertainment Association

Rooms